Urbain Hémard (Entraygues, Aveyron circa 1548 - 14 October 1592 Estaing, Aveyron) was a French physician and dentist. He wrote the first French work entirely devoted to dentistry.

Biography
He studied at the University of Montpellier and settled around 1529 in Rodez where he served as lieutenant to the King's First Surgeon for his colleagues in the Sénéchaussée and the Diocese of Rouergue.

He was one of the doctors of Rodez called in 1586 to the bedside of Margaret of Valois, who had taken refuge in the castle of Carlat after her rupture with her family and the King of Navarre, the future Henri IV.

In 1589, he went to Aix-en-Provence, which was afflicted by the plague, and was congratulated by Antoine Davin, the King's physician.

It was in Rodez that Bishop Georges d'Armagnac, ambassador of Francis I in Venice, suffering from dental pains called upon him. Hémard remained for ten years in the service of the Cardinal of Armagnac.

In 1582, Hémard dedicated his book Recherche de la vraye anathomie des dents, nature et propriété d'icelles (Research into the true anatomy of the teeth, their nature and properties) to the Cardinal, preceded a few months ahead by an Essay sur les dents (Essay on Teeth).

Taking advantage of his notoriety, he held the post of Consul twice, in 1581 and 1589, but in 1589, he betrayed the confidence of his fellow citizens by taking the side of the Leagueers against that of the Royalists. Indeed, using his status as consul, he facilitated the entry into the city of soldiers of the League against the advice of his rather royalist fellow citizens. The situation quickly degenerated and the inhabitants of the city were the object of vexations: serious incidents broke out. Banished, he found refuge in Estaing and died there on 14 October 1592, at the age of less than fifty.

Works
The book Recherche de la vraye anathomie des dents, nature et propriété d'icelles consists of twenty-three chapters: the first three are devoted to the names, nature and properties of the teeth, the next three to "feeling", the next seven to the development of the teeth, four of which deal with odontogenesis and three with tooth eruption, and finally the last ten deal with dental diseases, four of which are therapeutic and the last with prophylaxis.
 The name, genus and substance of the teeth
 The necessity of teeth and their different properties from other bones
 Special properties of the teeth
 Whether the teeth have feelings and to which part they should be attributed
 How is the substance of the teeth made participant of feeling and whether it can be offended of any quality that touches it
 If the bones have a feeling
 Matter from which teeth are produced according to the common opinion of philosophers and doctors
 That the first teeth that are born and the second estimated to be reborn are formed in the matrix
 From the consideration of Hippocrates' and Aristotle's reasons on the matter of teeth and the birth of teeth
 How are the teeth formed and completed
 How the teeth come out for the first time
 The second emergence of the teeth
 Roots and tooth connections
 Diseases that occur at the first emergence of the teeth
 Means and remedies to alleviate the pain that occurs when small children's teeth first come out
 Diseases of second teeth
 Remedies and means to overcome internal dental diseases from antecedent causes
 What to do if the pain doesn't go away
 If we can cure the strong pain of the teeth by notes and charms
 Trembling, rusting and rotting teeth
 Tremors that occur in the teeth due to the use of quicksilver
 From the astonishment or freezing of the teeth that we call esgassure in our country of Entrigues
 Means and remedies required for the preservation of teeth

Bibliography

Legacy 
A residential street bears his name in Rodez.

References

16th-century French people
16th-century French physicians
French dentists
People from Aveyron
1592 deaths
University of Montpellier alumni